Bianca Caruso (born 25 May 1996) is an Italian sailor. She and Elena Berta won the bronze medal at the 2021 470 World Championships. They were officially named to the Italian team on 19 March 2021. They competed in 470 at the 2020 Summer Olympics.

References

External links
 
 
 

1996 births
Living people
Italian female sailors (sport)
Olympic sailors of Italy
Sailors at the 2020 Summer Olympics – 470
Sportspeople from Rome
21st-century Italian women